Vail Mountain is a summit in Iron County in the U.S. state of Missouri. Vail Mountain lies to the east of Russell Mountain and the road (Missouri Route CC) to the summit of Taum Sauk Mountain passes just west of the summit of Vail Mountain. Routes 21 and 72 traverse the south spur of the mountain before heading south through Royal Gorge.

Vail Mountain has the name of the local Vail family.

References

Mountains of Iron County, Missouri
Mountains of Missouri